The following is a list of all known disasters in Antarctica which have resulted in fatalities. It includes disasters which happened on land, as well as in the waters surrounding the continent.

See also

 List of disasters in Australia by death toll
 List of disasters in Canada by death toll
 List of disasters in Croatia by death toll
 List of disasters in Great Britain and Ireland by death toll
 List of disasters in New Zealand by death toll
 List of disasters in Poland by death toll
 List of disasters in the United States by death toll

References

External links
 MapReport.com's Antarctica, Disasters Timeline
 CoolAntarctica.com's Antarctica Fire History

Antarctica-related lists
Disasters in Antarctica
Antarctica
Lists of disasters